Kulidzha (Kaitag and Dargwa: Кьулижа) is a rural locality (a selo) in Shilyaginsky Selsoviet, Kaytagsky District, Republic of Dagestan, Russia. The population was 401 as of 2010. There are 8 streets.

Geography 
Kulidzha is located 12 km southwest of Madzhalis (the district's administrative centre) by road. Shilyagi and Dzhigiya are the nearest rural localities.

Nationalities 
Dargins live there.

References 

Rural localities in Kaytagsky District